Etoile is a 1989 film starring Jennifer Connelly and Gary McCleery.

Plot
The American ballerina Claire Hamilton travels to Hungary to join a prestigious ballet school. The school is haunted by the spirit of a ballerina who died in a carriage accident, that possesses Claire.

Cast

Production
Following the release of the science fiction film Julia and Julia, director Peter Del Monte followed up the film with another in the fantastique genre. The producer Achille Manzotti provided the director with a cast that included Jennifer Connelly, Gary McCleery and Charles Durning. Filming began in Budapest and Italy in 1988 under the working title of Ballerina.

Release
Etoile was distributed theatrically in Italy by Aristi Associati and released on 17 March 1989. The film was awarded the Critic's Award at the 1990 Fantasporto Film Festival in Portugal.

Reception
According to Italian critic and historian Roberto Curti, Etoile was "ravaged" by Italian critics. Maurizio Porro of Corriere della Sera stated the film appeared to resemble a remake of Dario Argento's Opera "without suspense". Porro commented that the film was "confused and not at all fascinating" declaring it Del Monte's worst film.

See also
 List of Italian films of 1989

References

Footnotes

Sources

External links

1989 films
English-language Italian films
Films about ballet
Films set in Budapest
Films shot in Budapest
Swan Lake
Films directed by Peter Del Monte
Films scored by Jürgen Knieper
1980s Italian films